Lurline may refer to:
Lurline (opera), an 1860 opera by William Vincent Wallace
Queen Lurline, a character in the Oz books by L. Frank Baum
"Lurline", a poem by Henry Kendall
 "Lurline", the Mask and Wig Club's first annual production in 1889

Ships
 , a steamboat on the Columbia River from 1878 to 1930
 , a Matson luxury ocean liner
  or SS Lurline
 , a brigantine made by Matthew Turner in 1887

People with the given name
Lurline Champagnie, English politician

See also
Lurline Baths, in San Francisco
 Lurleen (disambiguation)